Sars Bank (named for M. Sars and G. O. Sars) is located in the Drake Passage in between the southern tip of South America and Antarctica. The top of the bank lies a few hundred meters under sea level.  

The bank has been proposed by Chilean historian Mateo Martinic as the location of the phantom Elizabeth Island,  seen by Francis Drake's expedition in 1578. If the Sars Bank was ever above sea level it may have had significant biogeographical importance as a "bridge" between South America and Antarctica.

See also
Insular Chile
Peter I Island

References

Guyots
Landforms of Magallanes Region
Undersea banks of the Pacific Ocean
Seamounts of the Pacific Ocean